The Central District of Firuzkuh County is in Tehran province, Iran. At the National Census in 2006, its population was 29,036 in 8,105 households. The following census in 2011 counted 32,359 people in 9,718 households. At the latest census in 2016, the district had 27,056 inhabitants in 9,418 households.

References 

Firuzkuh County

Districts of Tehran Province

Populated places in Tehran Province

Populated places in Firuzkuh County